CGI Inc. (abbreviation of Consultants to Government and Industry Incorporated) is a Canadian multinational information technology consulting and systems integration company headquartered in Montreal, Quebec, Canada. The company went public in 1986 with a primary listing on the Toronto Stock Exchange. CGI is also a constituent of the S&P/TSX 60 and has a secondary listing on the New York Stock Exchange. As of 2022, CGI is based in forty countries with around 400 offices and employs approximately 88,000 people.

Services provided by CGI as of 2018 include application services, business consulting, business process services, IT infrastructure services, IT outsourcing services, and systems integration services, among others.

History

1970s-1980s: Early years 
CGI Inc. was founded as an IT consulting company on June 15, 1976, in Quebec City, Québec, by Serge Godin. Within several months he was joined by co-founder André Imbeau from Quebec City. They initially ran the business from Godin's basement with a single phone. Starting with one client, as the company grew in size the co-founders moved to Montreal, and by the end of their first year they had generated $138,000 in revenue. While CGI stands for "Conseillers en gestion et informatique" in French (which translates to "consultants in management and information technology" in English), the official English meaning would later become "Consultants to Government and Industry." In later years the company began to go to market as simply CGI.

Throughout the 1970s, CGI focused on the information technology (IT) services market. Later in the 1970s, CGI branched into IT outsourcing. CGI's annual revenue in 1986 was $25 million, and the same year CGI went public with an initial public offering (IPO).

1990s: Doubling in size 
CGI earned ISO 9001 certification for their "project management framework" in 1994, and in doing so became the first IT consulting firm in North America to comply with the ISO quality standard. In 1995, CGI entered into a commercial alliance with the large telecommunications company Bell Canada, with Bell Canada purchasing CGI shares then valued at $18.4 million. By the end of 1996, CGI's annual revenue was $122 million. In 1997, CGI acquired the company CDSL Holdings Limited (CDSL). After the acquisition, CGI's employees in both Canada and internationally numbered 2,500. In 1998 CGI acquired the Canadian company Bell Sygma, a Bell Canada subsidiary, which almost doubled CGI's size.

2000s: Expansion into international markets 
CGI acquired IMRGlobal in 2001 for $438 million, which added "global delivery options" for CGI. In 2003, the Canadian tech company Cognicase was bought out by CGI for US$221 million, and at the end of 2003 CGI had annual sales of $1.85 billion. In 2004, CGI purchased the majority of American Management Systems (AMS) for $858 million. As of late 2004, CGI was the world's eighth largest independent provider of information technology services.

CGI co-founder Serge Godin stepped aside as CEO in 2006, taking the new position of executive chairman of the board and appointing as new CEO Michael Roach. Annual revenue at CGI was $3.5 billion by the fiscal end of 2006. That same year, CGI became one of four primary Recovery Audit Contractors in the US, with responsibilities to audit region B. At the end of 2007, CGI had a backlog worth $12.04 billion and an annual revenue of $3.7 billion, employing around 26,500 people.

2010-2012: Second doubling in size 
In 2010, CGI acquired Stanley, Inc. for an enterprise value of approximately $1.07 billion. The deal came close to doubling CGI's presence in the United States and expanded CGI into defense and intelligence contracts. In 2010, CGI was included in the Forbes Global 2000 ranking of the 2,000 largest public companies in the world. As of 2011, there were 31,000 CGI employees in 125 offices worldwide and 89% of professionals at CGI also owned company shares.

In 2012, CGI acquired the UK-based computer services company Logica for £1.7 billion (CAN$2.7 billion) in cash. The acquisition raised the number of CGI's staff from 31,000 to 68,000, and CGI became the fifth largest independent business processes and IT services company in the world. It also made CGI the biggest tech firm in Canada. In 2012, CGI won a $143 million contract to provide operational support for the Army's training elements, the Deputy Chief of Staff for Intelligence, and the United States Army Training and Doctrine Command.

2013-2015: Contract work 
At the time, CGI's train occupancy mobile app, was being used by several train companies and institutions in Europe. In February 2013, the independent analyst firm Verdantix published a report comparing technology consulting and systems integration firms' ability to build efficient renewable energy management systems. The report named CGI as No. 4 on the "overall capabilities" score. Continuing to work in the financial sector, CGI was rated as a "major contender" by Everest Group in a 2013 PEAK Matrix study looking at IT outsourcing capital markets.

In 2011, CGI was one of many contractors involved in establishing a new federal health insurance marketplace, and HealthCare.gov was launched in 2013. CGI was also contracted to help develop health insurance marketplaces for some state governments.

In 2014, CGI had contracts with federal businesses such as Defense Information Services Agency, visa processing in China, and the Coast Guard and Department of Homeland Security. CGI also worked with state governments, for example the California Enterprise Data to Revenue (EDR) Project for the California Franchise Tax Board. In 2014, The Globe and Mail reported that CGI was operating ten security centers, from which 1,400 CGI employees monitor "data traffic for an undisclosed number of customers" that include the Canadian Payments Association, the National Bank of Canada, and about forty Canadian government departments.

By 2014, CGI had been working with the European space industry for years, and had developed software that helps support the missions of over 200 individual satellites. CGI had also created the Constellation Control Facility that control's the Galileo Commercial Service's 30 satellites, and software for the first satellite in the world with e-sail (electric solar wind sail). In 2014, CGI was awarded a new contract by Inmarsat, the safety communications provider for 98% of airlines. In 2014, 16% of CGI's revenue came from software.

In 2014, Canadian Business named Michael Roach, then CEO of CGI, the most innovative CEO of the Canada of the year. Fiscal revenue by the end of 2014 was C$10.5 billion, and in the first quarter of 2015, CGI had revenues of $2.54 billion.

2016-present: third CEO 

As of 2016, CGI ranked number 955 on the Forbes Global 2000. At the time, CGI had assets worth C$20.9 billion, annual sales of $10.7 billion, and a market value of $9.6 billion.

In 2016, CGI had contracts with the British Columbia Ministry of Health, the U.S. Navy to work on their NAVSUP Business Systems Center, the Swedish social insurance agency, Sears Canada, the Queensland government, among others.

In 2016, George D. Schindler succeeded Michael Roach as the third CEO in CGI's history.

In 2019, The Wall Street Journal indicated CGI was part of the Chinese APT10 group's Operation Cloud Hopper hack, which exposed companies' data from 2013 to 2017. The first known target was Rio Tinto, who was accessed through CGI's managed cloud.

Corporate affairs 
CGI originally stood for "Conseillers en gestion et informatique" (translated to English: "Consultants on management and information systems"). More recently, in English speaking countries it is taken to stand for "Consultants to Government and Industries").

Markets and corporate structure 
CGI has an international client base, with large institutional clients in a wide array of industries and markets. The United States made up 29% of their client base as of March 2015, while Canada was the second-highest percentage at 15%. The majority of CGI's remaining contracts were in Europe (around 40%), with 15% in the rest of the world.

CGI has a primary listing on the Toronto Stock Exchange and is a constituent of the S&P/TSX 60. It has a secondary listing on the New York Stock Exchange. As of March 2015, CGI made 42% of its revenue through government contracts.

CGI Federal 
CGI Federal is a wholly owned subsidiary of CGI Inc. CGI Federal has partnered with U.S. federal agencies to provide IT services in defense, diplomacy, intelligence, healthcare, environment, homeland security, justice, treasury and more. CGI Federal has annual revenue exceeding US$1 billion.

In 2018, CGI Federal opened an Innovation Center in Arlington, Virginia, to provide a dedicated collaboration space for agency and CGI experts to jointly explore the potential of new technologies.

Products and services
Originally CGI focused its products and services on IT consulting, and the company later branched into outsourcing, software development, and systems integration, among other industries. At the end of 2014, CGI earned 52% of its revenue from providing outsourcing services (specifically through IT services and to a lesser degree, business process services) and 48% of its revenue from systems integration and consulting. Services CGI supplies in relation to business consulting include business intelligence, business transformation, change management, cyber security, CIO advisory services, digital enterprise, as well as other industry-specific services. In relation to business process services, CGI offers customer service and billing, payment services, enterprise services, collections, engineering and logistics, document and data services, and a BPS service launch. CGI provides full IT outsourcing services. The following is an overview of services provided by CGI as of 2015:
 Application services
 Business consulting
 Business process services
 Infrastructure services
 IT outsourcing services
 Systems integration services
CGI also develops products and services for markets such as telecommunications, health, manufacturing, oil and gas, posts and logistics, retail and consumer services, transportation, and utilities. Clients include both private entities and central governments, state, provincial and local governments, and government departments dealing with defense, intelligence, space, health, human services, public safety, justice, tax, revenue and collections.

Awards 
CGI Federal was ranked 26th on the 2018 Washington Technology Top 100, and 72nd on the 2019 Bloomberg Government 200 (BGOV200). The company also was a finalist for the 2018 Greater Washington Government Contractor Awards, Contractor of the Year ($300 million+), and a 2017 ACT-IACT Igniting Innovation Award.

A number of CGI Federal executives have been recognized for leadership in their sectors, including: Tim Hurlebaus, president: 2019 Wash100, 2018 Fed100 and GovCon 2018 Executive of the Year finalist; Stephanie Mango, senior vice president: 2018 Pinnacle Awards, National Security Executive of the Year and 2018 Top 10 Executives to Watch In National Security; Malcolm Harden, vice president: 2019 Fed100; and Steve Soussa, senior vice president: 2018 Top 10 Health Care Leaders to Watch.

References

External links
 

 
1976 establishments in Quebec
Call centre companies
Canadian brands
Canadian companies established in 1976
Companies based in Montreal
Companies listed on the New York Stock Exchange
Companies listed on the Toronto Stock Exchange
Consulting firms established in 1976
Information technology companies of Canada
International information technology consulting firms
International management consulting firms
Outsourcing companies
S&P/TSX 60
Technology companies established in 1976